Martti Antero Koskenniemi (born 18 March 1953) is a Finnish international lawyer and former diplomat. Currently he is professor of International Law in the University of Helsinki and Director of the Erik Castrén Institute of International Law and Human Rights, as well as Centennial Professor at the Law Department of the London School of Economics. He is well known for his critical approach to international law. In 2008–2009 he held the seat of distinguished visiting Goodhart Professor at the Faculty of Law, Cambridge University. In 2011 Koskenniemi was Peace of Utrecht professor at Utrecht University. In 2014 he was elected a Corresponding Fellow of the British Academy. Koskenniemi is currently serving as an Academy Professor for the Academy of Finland.

Previously he has been Global Professor of Law in the New York University, and a member of the International Law Commission (2002–2006). He served in the Finnish Diplomatic Service in the years 1978–1996, lastly as director of the Division of International Law. He was Finland's counsel in the International Court of Justice in the Passage through the Great Belt case (Finland v. Denmark) (1991–1992).

From 1997 to 2003 he served as a judge in the administrative tribunal of the Asian Development Bank.

He is a member of the Institut de droit international.

Writings
From Apology to Utopia; The Structure of International Legal Argument (first published 1989) presents a critical view of international law as an argumentative practice that attempts to remove the political from international relations. It asserts that international law is vulnerable to criticisms of being either an irrelevant moralist utopia or an apology for Realpolitik.

The Gentle Civilizer of Nations: The Rise and Fall of International Law 1870–1960 (2001) has two agendas.  The first of these is to develop an intellectual history of international law, and to offer a critique of that history. The second is to offer a sociology of the profession of international law, using biographical studies of Hersch Lauterpacht, Carl Schmitt and Hans Morgenthau.

References

External links
Kenneth Anderson's Blog: Martti Koskenniemi (Theory)
Talks and Papers on Erik Castren Institute website
Online Articles on Erik Castren Institute website
Iraq and the "Bush Doctrine" of Pre-Emptive Self-Defence. An analysis by Martti Koskenniemi, Crimes of War Project.
Special issue of the German Law Journal marking the re-publication of "From Apology to Utopia"
 article on Martti Koskenniemi's scholarly work
 FRAGMENTATION OF INTERNATIONAL LAW:                                Report of the Study Group of the International Law Commission, Finalized by Martti Koskenniemi

1953 births
Living people
20th-century Finnish lawyers
Finnish diplomats
Legal historians
International law scholars
Academic staff of the University of Helsinki
Finnish legal scholars
Members of the Institut de Droit International
People from Turku
Academic staff of Utrecht University
Corresponding Fellows of the British Academy
International Law Commission officials
Finnish officials of the United Nations
21st-century Finnish lawyers
Members of the International Law Commission